Walid Mahmoud El Doumiati (born July 16, 1968 in Beirut, Lebanon) is a retired Lebanese professional basketball player who last played for Sporting Al Riyadi Beirut. Doumiati alongside Elie Mechantaf and Fadi El Khatib helped build the sport of basketball in Lebanon since the draft of Lebanese NBA player Rony Seikaly. Walid was committed to Sporting Al Riyadi Beirut leading the team to successive titles, despite being held back by archrivals Hekmeh BC during the 1990s. Walid was also a member of the Lebanon national basketball team during its first ever appearance in the 2002 FIBA World Championship in Indianapolis after earning a silver medal at the 2001 ABC Championship.

References 

1968 births
Living people
Lebanese men's basketball players
Sportspeople from Beirut
Small forwards
2002 FIBA World Championship players
Al Riyadi Club Beirut basketball players